Axel Enström may refer to:

Axel Enström (1893–1977), Swedish industrialist
Axel Fredrik Enström (1875–1948), Swedish electrical engineer